John Whitehill (December 11, 1729 – September 16, 1815) was a member of the U.S. House of Representatives from Pennsylvania.

John Whitehill (father of James Whitehill and brother of Robert Whitehill) was born in Salisbury Township, Lancaster County, Pennsylvania.  He studied law, was admitted to the bar and commenced practice in Lancaster County.  He was appointed justice of the peace and justice of the orphans’ court of Lancaster County in 1777.  He was a member of the Pennsylvania House of Representatives in 1780–1782 and 1793.  He served as a member of the council of censors in 1783, and was a delegate to the supreme executive council in 1784.  He was a member of the State ratification convention in 1787.  He served as associate judge of Lancaster County in 1791.

Whitehill was elected as a Republican to the Eighth and Ninth Congresses.  He died in Salisbury Township.  Interment in Pequea Presbyterian Church Cemetery.

See also
Whitehill–Wise family

References

The Political Graveyard

1729 births
1815 deaths
Politicians from Lancaster, Pennsylvania
Members of the Pennsylvania House of Representatives
Pennsylvania state court judges
American Presbyterians
Democratic-Republican Party members of the United States House of Representatives from Pennsylvania